Paul Wesley "Doc" Evans (June 20, 1907 – January 10, 1977) was an American jazz cornetist.

Evans was born in Spring Valley, Minnesota. the son of a Methodist minister. He learned piano and drums as a child, and played saxophone in high school. He graduated from Carleton College with a B.A. in English, and played with the Carleton Collegians dance band there. He gave up saxophone in the late 1920s for cornet, and played Dixieland jazz regularly in Minneapolis at that time.

Evans continued to play through the Great Depression, turning down offers to play outside of the Midwest. In 1947, he led the band that played for the opening of Chicago's Jazz, Ltd. club upon being persuaded by clarinetist Bill Reinhardt. He worked in Chicago until 1952, and then embarked on nationwide tours, recording frequently along the way. Evans recorded as a leader for Disc Records in 1947, and for Joco Records, based in Northfield, Minnesota, in 1949-1950. In August, 1953, Evans gave a series of concerts at the Walker Art Center in Minneapolis, Minnesota. These concerts were recorded, and issued on LP by Soma Recording Company, based in Minneapolis. Evans also recorded extensively for Audiophile Records.

He returned to Minneapolis and continued playing jazz up until his last recordings in 1975. He also founded the Bloomington Symphony Orchestra and conducted it until his death, in Minneapolis, Minnesota.

In 1999, a yearly Doc Evans Jazz Festival was founded in Minnesota that ran for nine years.

A website, docevans.com is maintained by his son, Allan Evans.

References

1907 births
1977 deaths
American jazz cornetists
20th-century American musicians
People from Spring Valley, Minnesota
Jazz musicians from Minnesota
Tempo Records (US) artists